Ojembe Olatuga (born 24 January 1988 in Lagos) is a Nigerian footballer.

Career
Olatuga began his career by Youth Star Sporting Club, before later transferring in 2006 to the Finnish second league team Atlantis FC. In January 2008, he along with his teammates Alimamy Jalloh and Michael Ozor left the squad and joined SoVo.

After six months SoVo, Olatuga again transferred, this time to HIFK. He spent one season with his new club, before signing in January 2009 with Lohjan Pallo.

Titles
2006 Youth Champion in Finland with Atlantis FC

References

1988 births
Living people
Atlantis FC players
Nigerian footballers
Nigerian expatriate footballers
Nigerian expatriate sportspeople in Finland
Expatriate footballers in Finland
HIFK Fotboll players
Association football defenders